This is a list of the recipients of the Bangla Academy Literary Award from 1960 to 1969.

1960 
 Farrukh Ahmad (poetry)
 Abul Mansur Ahmed (short story)
 Abul Hashem Khan (novel)
 Abdullah Hel Kafi (essay-research)
 Mohammad Barkatullah (essay-research)
 Askar Ibne Shaikh (drama)
 Khan Mohammad Moinuddin (juvenile literature)

1961 
 Ahsan Habib (poetry)
 Syed Waliullah (novel)
 Mobin Uddin Ahmed (short story)
 Muhammad Abdul Hye (essay-research)
 Nurul Momen (drama)
 Begum Hosney Ara (juvenile literature)

1962 
 Sufia Kamal (poetry)
 Abul Fazal (novel)
 Shawkat Osman (short story)
 Akbar Ali (novel)
 Munier Choudhury (drama) 
 Bande Ali Mia (juvenile literature)

1963 
 Abul Hussain (poetry)
 Abu Ishaque (novel)
 Abu Rashid Matin Uddin (short story)
 Abdul Quadir (essay-research)
 Ibrahim Khan (drama)
 Kazi Kader Newaj (juvenile literature)

1964 
 Sanaul Huq (poetry)
 Benajir Ahmed (poetry)
 Shamsuddin Abul Kalam (novel)
 Shahed Ali (short story)
 Muhammad Enamul Huq (essay-research)
  (drama)
 Ashraf Siddiqui (juvenile literature)
 Habibur Rahman (juvenile literature)

1965 
 Talim Hossain (poetry)
Mahbub Ul Alam (novel)
 Alauddin Al-Azad (short story)
 Muhammad Mansuruddin (essay-research)
 Obaidul Huq (drama)
 Mohammad Modabber (juvenile literature)

1966 
 Mahmuda Khatun Siddiqua (poetry)
Kazi Afsaruddin Ahmed (novel)
 Syed Shamsul Haque (short story)
 Qazi Motahar Hossain (essay-research)
 Sikandar Abu Zafar (drama)
Abu Zoha Nur Ahmed (juvenile literature)

1967 
 Syed Ali Ahsan (poetry)
 Sarder Jayenuddin (novel)
 Abdul Gaffar Chowdhury (short story)
 Mazharul Islam (essay-research)
 ANM Bazlur Rashid (drama)
 Mohammad Nasir Ali (juvenile literature)

1968 
 Al Mahmud (poetry)
 Abu Jafar Shamsuddin (novel)
 Shawkat Ali (short story)
 Ahmed Sharif (essay-research)
 Anis Chowdhury (drama)
 Rokanuzzaman Khan (juvenile literature)

1969 
 Shamsur Rahman (poetry)
 Shahidullah Kaiser (novel)
 Burhanuddin Khan Jahangir (short story)
 Nilima Ibrahim (essay-research)
 Ali Mansur (drama)
 Golam Rahman (juvenile literature)

References

Bengali literary awards
Bangladeshi literary awards
Lists of award winners
Civil awards and decorations of Bangladesh